The Neutral Internet Exchange (abbreviated as NL-ix, with the last two letters typeset in lowercase) is an Internet exchange in Europe, which is distributed across seventy-four data centres in thirty-one European cities in 13 countries by year-end 2015. The exchange was founded in 2002 to serve as an alternative to the Amsterdam Internet Exchange. As of May 26, 2015, the daily average inbound traffic is 619.48 Gbit/s and the daily average outbound traffic 616.77 Gbit/s and 513 members are connected on 1762 ports. On March 4, 2011, it was announced that Dutch landline and mobile telecommunications company KPN had purchased and, subsequently, acquired the exchange.

Datacenters
NL-ix members can connect at 96 sites in 31 cities across 7 countries.

References

External links
Neutral Internet Exchange (official website)

Internet in the Netherlands
Internet exchange points in the Netherlands